Thotlavalluru mandal is one of the 25 mandals in Krishna district of the Indian state of Andhra Pradesh. It is under the administration of Vuyyuru revenue division and its headquarters are located at North Valluru. The mandal lies on the banks of Krishna River and is bounded by Kankipadu, Vuyyuru and Pamidimukkala mandals. The mandal is also a part of the Andhra Pradesh Capital Region under the jurisdiction of APCRDA.

Towns and villages 

 census, the mandal has 16 villages.

The settlements in the mandal are listed below:

See also 
Villages in Thotlavalluru mandal

References 

Mandals in Krishna district